The 16th (Schleswig-Holstein) Hussars “Emperor Francis Joseph of Austria, King of Hungary” were a cavalry regiment of the Royal Prussian Army. The regiment was formed in 1866. It fought in the Franco-Prussian war and World War I. In 1872 it was named after Emperor Francis Joseph I of Austria, who became its colonel-in-chief. The regiment was stationed in Gottorf Castle until its disbanding in 1918.

See also
List of Imperial German cavalry regiments

References

Cavalry regiments of the Prussian Army
Military units and formations established in 1866
Hussars
1866 establishments in Prussia